Kyriakos Domnandos  (Greek: Κυριακός Δομνάνδος; 1789 - 1852), was a naturalist, professor, dean, author, and diplomat.  He was one of the first professors at the newly founded University of Athens and one of the first naturalists in modern Greece.  He was the first professor to teach zoology and natural history and did extensive research on molluscs specifically on living organisms and fossils.  Domnandos was the second Dean of the School of Philosophy which was part of the University of Athens from (1838-1841) and was one of the co-founders of the Physiographic Society that laid the foundation of the Physiographic Museum or Natural History Museum; moreover, the collection of animals, plants, and fossils started by the Physiographic Society became part of the Zoological Museum of the University of Athens.      He was also a member of the Filiki Eteria.

History
Domnandos was born in Vienna, Austria.  His family was originally from Crete, they initially moved to Constantinople but eventually fled to Vienna leaving behind their erstwhile home.  He showed an interest in the sciences from an early age.  By the age of twenty, he became the director of a trading house in Bucharest; in addition, two years later in 1811, he was the Secretary of the Consulate General of Russia in Bucharest.  In 1819, he was initiated into the Greek revolutionary secret society Filiki Eteria by Georgios Leventes; consequently, the Russian government discovered his affiliation with the rebel group and he was exiled to Paris.  While in Paris, he studied the natural sciences.
      
By 1834, he returned to Greece, and three years later on April 14, 1837, Domnandos became a professor at the newly founded University of Athens and taught natural history and zoology.  One year later he became Dean of the School of Philosophy and remained in that position from 1838-1841.  In collaboration with other faculty, he tried to introduce Zoology, Mineralogy, Geology, and Botany to the newly founded University.  He attended an International Congress for naturalists in 1839 which was held in Turin, Italy.  At the conference, he announced the discovery of fossilized remains discovered near Harvati, Pallini in Athens, Greece. The remains chiefly belonged to Monkeys and Rhinoceroses.      

By the year 1845, at fifty-six years old, Domnandos left the University and founded the French language newspaper "Courrier d'Athènes".  He became a member of the Committee of the Italian and Greek Theater and became Secretary of the Greek Embassy in Paris and by November 1, 1850, he was elected honorary Professor of the University of Athens but died two years later in Paris in May of 1852, he was around 63 years old.  He influenced the younger generation of scientists both Nikolaos Apostolidis and Theodoros G. Orphanides wrote about his work.

References

Bibliography

1789 births
1852 deaths
19th-century Greek educators
19th-century Greek scientists
18th-century Greek educators
18th-century Greek scientists
Academic staff of the National and Kapodistrian University of Athens
Greek archaeologists
Diplomats from Vienna
Writers from Vienna
Scientists from Vienna